Virginia de la Cruz was a Paraguayan actress whose career was most prolific in Argentina. She starred in the 1950 film Arroz con leche under director Carlos Schlieper. She was married actor and conductor Carlos Ginés.

References

External links
 
 

Paraguayan film actresses
20th-century Paraguayan actresses
Year of birth missing
Year of death missing